Doravirine, sold under the brand name Pifeltro, is a non-nucleoside reverse transcriptase inhibitor medication developed by Merck & Co. for use in the treatment of HIV/AIDS.

Doravirine was approved for medical use in the United States in August 2018.

References

External links 
 

Nitriles
Trifluoromethyl compounds
Merck & Co. brands
Nitrogen heterocycles
Non-nucleoside reverse transcriptase inhibitors
Chloroarenes
Phenol ethers